Profenamine (INN; also known as ethopropazine (BAN); trade names Parsidol, Parsidan, Parkin) is a phenothiazine derivative used as an antiparkinsonian agent that has anticholinergic, antihistamine, and antiadrenergic actions. It is also used in the alleviation of the extrapyramidal syndrome induced by drugs such as other phenothiazine compounds, but, like other compounds with antimuscarinic properties, is of no value against tardive dyskinesia.

Synthesis
For promoting bone growth:

The alkylation between phenothiazine [92-84-2] (1) and 1-Diethylamino-2-chloropropane [761-21-7] (2) in the presence of Sodium amide gives ethopropazine (3). 

The aziridinium salt helps to rationalize why a rearrangement product is observed (ala methadone). This was also observewd for Aceprometazine.

References 

Alpha-1 blockers
Antihistamines
H1 receptor antagonists
Muscarinic antagonists
Phenothiazines
Diethylamino compounds